The Outreau trial was a 2004 criminal trial in northern France on various counts of sexual abuse against children. The trial and the appeal trial revealed that the main witness for the prosecution, convicted for the abuse, had lied about the involvement of other suspects, who were in fact innocent. Several innocent suspects had nevertheless spent years jailed on remand and one died while in prison.

The trials resulted in a national outrage in France, with journalists, politicians and the public opinion questioning how such a miscarriage of justice could happen, with innocent men and women being held for years in jail on unfounded suspicions.  In January 2006, a parliamentary inquiry was created, with President Jacques Chirac calling the affair a "judicial disaster".

Outreau affair
The "Outreau affair", which concerned an alleged criminal network in Outreau, a working class town next to Boulogne-sur-Mer in the Pas-de-Calais region, began in November 2001. The first trial took place in Saint-Omer in 2004, and the appeal took place in Paris in 2005.

Seventeen people were accused. Mostly parents, they were charged with child sexual abuse and incest and their children were separated from them for much of this time. The affair began when some school teachers and social workers noticed “strange sexual behavior” from four children in a local school. Psychologists believed the children to be credible witnesses, but doctors found no evidence of sexual abuse. The parents were accused on the testimony of some of the children, which was then backed up by the confessions of some of the accused.

The defendants were held in custody for from one to three years. In the first trial (in 2004), four of the eighteen admitted guilt and were convicted, while seven denied involvement and were acquitted. Six further defendants denied the charges but were convicted and given light sentences – they appealed their convictions, and were heard by the Paris Cour d'assises in autumn 2005. On the first day of the hearing, the prosecution's claims were destroyed, and all six were acquitted. Another defendant died in prison while awaiting trial.

Judicial process

First trial
The trial took place before Saint-Omer's Cour d'assises, composed of three professional judges and nine jurors.

The case involved an alleged ring of 17 persons, with the charges based on one woman's evidence and some corroborating statements from alleged victims. The alleged offenders were condemned on the grounds of certain adults' and, most of all, the children's testimony, together with psychiatric evidence. The children's testimony took place in "huis clos" (behind closed doors); such a procedure is normal in France for victims of sexual abuse, especially minors.

The six convicted persons who denied any responsibility appealed their convictions.

The woman who had given much of the evidence later confessed in court she had lied, and the children's revelations were found to be unreliable. Only four of the accused ever confessed, all the others insisted on their innocence: one died in jail during the investigation, 7 others were acquitted during the first trial in May 2004, the last 6 during the second trial on the evening of 1 December 2005.

Second trial
The appeal took place before Paris' Cour d'assises, composed of three professional judges and twelve jurors, used as an appellate court for review of both facts and law.

On its first day, the prosecution's claims were dismissed, owing to the statement of the main prosecution witness, Myriam Badaoui, who had declared on 18 November that the six convicted persons "had not done anything" and that she had herself lied. Thierry Delay, her former husband, backed up her statement. During the trial, the psychological evidence was also called into question, as it appeared biased and lacking in weight. The denials of two children, who admitted that they had formerly lied, also contributed to the destruction of the prosecution's claims. One of the psychologists said on TV: "I am paid the same as a cleaning lady, so I provide a cleaning lady's expertise," which caused further public indignation.

At the end of the trial, the prosecutor (avocat général) asked for the acquittal of all of the accused persons. The defence renounced its right to plead, preferring to observe a minute of silence in favor of François Mourmand, who had died in prison during remand. Yves Bot, general prosecutor of Paris, came to the trial on its last day, without previously notifying the president of the Cour d'assises, Mrs. Mondineu-Hederer; while there, Bot presented his apologies to the defendants on behalf of the legal system—he did this before the verdict was delivered, taking for granted a "not guilty" ruling, for which some magistrates reproached him afterwards.

All six defendants were finally acquitted on 1 December 2005, putting an end to five years of trials, which have been described by the French media as a "judicial foundering" or even as a "judicial Chernobyl".

Remaining sentences
Four people remained convicted after the appeal trial: Myriam Badaoui (who had not appealed her conviction), her husband, and a couple of neighbours. Myriam Badaoui, her husband, and one of the neighbours confessed that they had wrongfully accused other people to have been involved in the abuse cases, whereas only the four of them had been involved.

Myriam Badaoui was convicted and sentenced to 15 years in prison, her husband to 20 years. Myriam Badoui was freed in 2015.

Aftermath

Questioning on French justice and media involvement
The affair caused public indignation and questions about the general workings of justice in France. The role of an inexperienced magistrate, Fabrice Burgaud, fresh out of the Ecole Nationale de la Magistrature was underscored, as well as the undue weight given to children's words and to psychiatric expertise, both of which were revealed to have been wrong.

The media's relation of the events was also questioned; although they were quick to point out the judicial error, they also had previously endorsed the "Outreau affair".

Parliamentary inquiry
After the second trial, the Prime Minister Dominique de Villepin, the minister of justice Pascal Clément and President Chirac himself officially apologised to the victims in the name of the government and of the judicial institutions.

In January 2006, there was a special parliamentary enquiry (for the first time broadcast live on television) about this catastrophe judiciaire (judicial disaster), which had been called by President Chirac in order to help prevent a recurrence of this situation through alterations in France's legal system. The role of experts (who had drawn hasty conclusions from children's testimony) and child protection advocates, lack of legal representation, the responsibility of the judges (the prosecution's case depended in this instance on a single investigative magistrate) and the role of the mass media were examined.

The acquitted persons' hearing by the parliamentary enquiry caused a surge of emotion through the whole country. The affair was designated a "judiciary shipwreck".

Fabrice Burgaud
On 24 April 2009 the Conseil supérieur de la magistrature sentenced Burgaud to a reprimand (réprimande avec inscription au dossier), the lowest disciplinary penalty in the French judiciary system. Since then the case was "dropped".

Film
In 2011 a film, Présumé coupable (English title: Presumed Guilty) was released, a drama documentary about the case from the viewpoint of Alain Marecaux, one of the acquitted defendants (even though accused of sex offense by his son François-Xavier Marécaux), based on his memoirs.

In 2012 another film Outreau, l'autre vérité (English title: Outreau, the other truth) was released. It is a documentary about the case from the viewpoint of some of the children, the experts and the magistrates. It paints a picture of how the press was manipulated by the defence lawyers, and how the words of the children were stifled.

See also
 McMartin preschool trial, a Californian case where several adults accused of sexual abuse remained on remand for years before charges were dropped.
 Orkney child abuse scandal, a Scottish child abuse prosecution that collapsed on its first day of trial.

References

External links
 Collapse of child sex case shakes French courts

Political scandals in France
Sex scandals
Day care sexual abuse allegations
2004 in France
2004 in law
Trials in France
Wrongful convictions
Saint-Omer
Child sexual abuse in France